Ərəbqardaşbəyli or Arabkardashbeyli may refer to:
Ərəbqardaşbəyli, Neftchala, Azerbaijan
Ərəbqardaşbəyli, Salyan, Azerbaijan